Semioptila fulveolans is a moth in the Himantopteridae family. It was described by Paul Mabille in 1897. It is found in Angola, the Democratic Republic of the Congo (West Kasai), South Africa and Tanzania.

References

Moths described in 1897
Himantopteridae